Steve Peers is a British academic and an expert on the European Union. He is a Professor in the School of Law at the University of Essex. He is the author of EU Justice and Home Affairs Law and The Brexit: The Legal Framework for Withdrawal from the EU or Renegotiation of EU Membership.

Early life
Steve Peers graduated from McMaster University, where he received a bachelor of arts degree in history in 1988. He earned an LL.B. from the Western Law School at the University of Western Ontario, an LL.M. in EU Law from the London School of Economics in 1993, and a Ph.D from the University of Essex in 2001.

Career
Peers is a Professor in the School of Law at the University of Essex. He also taught at the European Inter-University Centre for Human Rights and Democratisation in Venice, Italy in April 2016.

Peers is the author of EU Justice and Home Affairs Law, which was reviewed by Dr Colin Harvey of Queen's University Belfast in the Oxford Journal of Legal Studies in 2003 and Professor Friedemann Kainer of the University of Mannheim in Integration in 2007. He also authored The Brexit: The Legal Framework for Withdrawal from the EU or Renegotiation of EU Membership. He is the co-author of The EU Citizenship Directive: A Commentary, and the co-editor of several books about European Union law.

Peers has written commentaries for the Brussels-based Centre for European Policy Studies; New Europeans, a pro-European Union organization; and The UK in a Changing Europe, a think tank funded by the Economic and Social Research Council (ESRC) and based at King’s College London.

Peers has advised the British government on EU policy. In October 2016, he argued that banning foreign-born academics like Sara Hagemann from serving as advisors to the Foreign and Commonwealth Office on Brexit would "come across as hostile, narrow and xenophobic." He tweeted, "What kind of know-nothing nativist govt rejects the expertise of all non-citizens?".

Works

References

External links
Faculty webpage

Living people
McMaster University alumni
Western Law School alumni
Alumni of the London School of Economics
Alumni of the University of Essex
Academics of the University of Essex
European Union law scholars
English book editors
Year of birth missing (living people)